Hasemann's Daughters (German:Hasemanns Töchter) is a 1920 German silent film directed by Heinrich Bolten-Baeckers and starring Leo Peukert. It is an adaptation of Adolphe L'Arronge's 1877 play of the same title.

Cast
 Conrad Dreher
 Sabine Impekoven 
 Leo Peukert

References

Bibliography
 Hans-Michael Bock & Michael Töteberg. Das Ufa-Buch. Zweitausendeins, 1992.

External links

1920 films
Films of the Weimar Republic
Films directed by Heinrich Bolten-Baeckers
German silent feature films
German films based on plays
German black-and-white films